Red Eagle Lake is located in Glacier National Park, in the U. S. state of Montana. Red Eagle Mountain rises to the west of the lake and Saint Mary Lake is to the north. Red Eagle Lake is accessible from the Triple Divide Trail and is a  hike from St. Mary, Montana.

See also
List of lakes in Glacier County, Montana

References

Lakes of Glacier National Park (U.S.)
Lakes of Glacier County, Montana